Inelvo Moreno Álvarez (born 27 January 1970) is a Mexican politician affiliated with the Party of the Democratic Revolution. As of 2014 he served as Deputy of the LIX Legislature of the Mexican Congress representing Michoacán.

References

1970 births
Living people
Politicians from Mexico City
Party of the Democratic Revolution politicians
Universidad Michoacana de San Nicolás de Hidalgo alumni
Members of the Congress of Michoacán
Deputies of the LIX Legislature of Mexico
Members of the Chamber of Deputies (Mexico) for Michoacán